Selfridges, also known as Selfridges & Co., is a chain of high-end department stores in the United Kingdom that is operated by Selfridges Retail Limited, part of the Selfridges Group of department stores. It was founded by Harry Gordon Selfridge in 1908.  
 
The historic Daniel Burnham-designed flagship store on London's Oxford Street is the second-largest shop in the UK (after Harrods) and opened on 15 March 1909. Other Selfridges stores opened in the Trafford Centre (1998) and Exchange Square (2002) in Manchester, and in the Bullring in Birmingham (2003).

In the 1940s, smaller provincial Selfridges stores were sold to the John Lewis Partnership, and in 1951, the original Oxford Street store was acquired by the Liverpool-based Lewis's chain of department stores.  Lewis's and Selfridges were then taken over in 1965 by the Sears Group, owned by Charles Clore. Expanded under the Sears Group to include branches in Manchester and Birmingham, the chain was acquired in 2003 by Canada's Galen Weston for £598 million.

In December 2021, the Weston family agreed to sell the majority of Selfridges Group for around £4 billion to a joint venture between Thai conglomerate Central Group and Austria's Signa Holding. The acquisition was completed on 23 August 2022.

History

The basis of Harry Gordon Selfridge's success was his relentlessly innovative marketing, which was elaborately expressed in his Oxford Street store. Originally from America himself, Selfridge attempted to dismantle the idea that consumerism was strictly an American phenomenon. He tried to make shopping a fun adventure and a form of leisure instead of a chore, transforming the department store
into a social and cultural landmark that provided women with a public space in which they could be comfortable and legitimately indulge themselves. Emphasizing the importance of creating a welcoming environment, he placed merchandise on display so customers could examine it, moved the highly profitable perfume counter front-and-centre on the ground floor, and established policies that made it safe and easy for customers to shop. These techniques have been adopted by modern department stores around the world.

Either Selfridge or Marshall Field is popularly held to have coined the phrase "the customer is always right", and Selfridge used it regularly in his advertising.

Selfridge attracted shoppers with educational and scientific exhibits and was himself interested in education and science, believing that the displays would introduce potential new customers to Selfridges and thus generate both immediate and long-term sales.

In 1909, after the first cross-Channel flight, Louis Blériot's monoplane was put on display at Selfridges, where it was seen by 12,000 people. John Logie Baird made the first public demonstration of moving silhouette images by television from the first floor of Selfridges from 1 to 27 April 1925.

In the 1920s and 1930s, the roof of the store hosted terraced gardens, cafes, a mini golf course and an all-girl gun club. The roof, with its extensive views across London, was a common place for strolling after a shopping trip and was often used for fashion shows.
During the Second World War, The store's basement was used as an air-raid shelter and during raids employees were usually on the lookout for incendiary bombs and took watch in turns.

A Milne-Shaw seismograph was set up on the Oxford Street store's third floor in 1932, attached to one of the building's main stanchions, where it remained unaffected by traffic or shoppers. It successfully recorded the Belgian earthquake of 11 June 1938, which was also felt in London. In 1947, it was given to the British Museum.
The huge SIGSALY scrambling apparatus, by which transatlantic conferences between American and British officials (most notably Winston Churchill and Franklin D. Roosevelt) were secured against eavesdropping, was housed in the basement from 1943 on, with extension to the Cabinet War Rooms about a mile away.

In 1926, Selfridges set up the Selfridge Provincial Stores company, which had expanded over the years to include sixteen provincial stores, but these were sold to the John Lewis Partnership in 1940. The Liverpool-based Lewis's chain of department stores acquired the remaining Oxford Street Shop in 1951, expanding the brand by adding Moultons of Ilford, purchased from rival chain R H O Hills and renaming the store Selfridges. In 1965 the business was purchased by the Sears Group, owned by Charles Clore.  Under the Sears group, branches in Ilford and Oxford opened, with the latter remaining Selfridges until 1986, when Sears rebranded it as a Lewis's store. In 1990, Sears Holdings split Selfridges from Lewis's and placed Lewis's in administration a year later. In March 1998, Selfridges acquired its current logo in tandem with the opening of the Manchester Trafford Centre store and Selfridges' demerger from Sears.

In September 1998, Selfridges expanded and opened a department store in the newly-opened Trafford Centre in Greater Manchester. Following its success, Selfridges announced they would open an additional  store in Exchange Square, Manchester city centre. The Exchange Square store opened in 2002 as Manchester city centre started to return to normal following the 1996 Manchester bombing. A  store opened in 2003 in Birmingham's Bull Ring.

In 2003, the chain was acquired by Canada's Galen Weston for £598 million and became part of Selfridges Group, which also includes Brown Thomas and Arnotts in Ireland, Holt Renfrew in Canada and de Bijenkorf in the Netherlands. Weston, a retailing expert who is also the owner of major supermarket chains in Canada, has chosen to invest in the renovation of the Oxford Street store – rather than to create new stores in British cities other than Manchester and Birmingham.

In October 2009, Selfridges revived its rooftop entertainment with the pop up "The Restaurant on the Roof" restaurant.  In July 2011, Truvia created an emerald green boating lake (with a waterfall, a boat-up cocktail bar and a forest of Stevia plants). In 2012 the Big Rooftop Tea and Golf Party featured "the highest afternoon tea on Oxford Street" and a nine-hole golf course with "the seven wonders of London" realised in cake as obstacles.

In August 2020, during a difficult time for UK retail, Selfridges offered luxury pieces for hire to millennial and socially conscious clients. The store partnered with HURR, an online fashion rental platform, offering hire of 100 items from over 40 fashion brands for up to 20 days at a time.

The Weston family put the Selfridges business up for auction in July 2021, with an estimated value of £4 billion. The sale includes all stores including the flagship Oxford Street store and worldwide outlets. In early December 2021, the family was reported to be finalising the chain's sale to Central Group.

On December 24, 2021, it was announced that the majority of Selfridges Group had been sold to a joint venture between Thai conglomerate Central Group and the Austrian Signa Holding for around £4 billion ($5.37 billion); the former owner (the Canadian branch of the Weston family) had bought Selfridges for nearly £600 million in 2003. The acquisition was completed on 23 August 2022.

The shop's early history was dramatised in ITV's 2013 series, Mr Selfridge.

Architecture 

Selfridge stores are known for architectural innovation and excellence, and are tourist destinations in their own right. The original London store was designed by Daniel Burnham, who also created the Marshall Field's main store in his home town of Chicago.  Burnham was the leading American department store designer of the time and had works in Boston (Filenes's), New York (Gimbel's, Wanamaker's), and Philadelphia (Wanamaker's, his magnum opus).

The London store was built in phases.  The first phase consisted of only the nine-and-a-half bays closest to the Duke Street corner, and is an example of one of the earliest uses of steel cage frame construction for this type of building in London. This circumstance, according to the report of a contemporary London correspondent from the Chicago Tribune, was largely responsible for making possible the eventual widespread use of Chicago’s steel frame cage construction system in the United Kingdom.

A scheme to erect a massive tower above the store was never carried out.

Also involved in the design of the store were American architect Francis Swales, who worked on decorative details, and British architects R. Frank Atkinson and Thomas Smith Tait.  The distinctive polychrome sculpture above the Oxford Street entrance is the work of British sculptor Gilbert Bayes.

The Daily Telegraph named Selfridges in London the world's best department store in 2010.

The Trafford store is noted for its use of stone and marble and for the exterior which strikingly resembles the London store. Each of the five floors of the Exchange Square store in central Manchester was designed by a different architect and has its own look and feel. In December 2009, store officials announced that the store will undergo a £40 million renovation to give it a more "iconic" look that has been associated with Selfridges. It has been announced the store will feature art installations using LED lighting that will be projected to the outside of the building at night.

The Birmingham store, designed by architects Future Systems, is covered in 15,000 spun aluminium discs on a background of Yves Klein Blue. Since it opened in 2003, the Birmingham store has been named every year by industry magazine Retail Week as one of the 100 stores to visit in the world. The building is also included as a desktop background in the Architecture theme in Windows 7.

Windows

Selfridges' windows have become synonymous also with the brand, and to a certain degree have become as famous as the company and Oxford Street location itself. Selfridges has a history of bold art initiatives when it comes to the window designs. Selfridge himself likened the act of shopping to the act of attending the theatre and encouraged his customers to make this connection as well by covering his show windows with silk curtains before dramatically unveiling the displays on opening day. Just as they do today, the window designs served as the opening act of the entire play of the Selfridge experience and helped capture the public’s attention to transform customers into true shoppers. Later, when the building was undergoing restoration, the scaffolding was shrouded with a giant photograph of stars such as Sir Elton John by Sam Taylor-Wood. The windows consistently attract tourists, designers and fashionistas alike to marvel at the current designs and styling and fashion trends.

Since 2002, the windows have been photographed by London photographer Andrew Meredith and published in magazines such as Vogue, Dwell, Icon, Frame, Creative Review, Hungarian Stylus Magazine, Design Week, Harper's Bazaar, The New York Times, WGSN as well as many worldwide media outlets, including the world wide press, journals, blogs and published books.

Opening day and marketing

The long lasting influence that Harry Selfridge would have on shopping and department stores became immediately clear with Selfridges' opening day. The store’s opening to much fanfare on 15 March 1909 laid the foundation for the success of the entire lifestyle that Selfridge aimed to promote. Even before the unveiling of the window displays, innovative marketing techniques set up the momentous occasion and the store for great success.

Harry Selfridge developed close relationships with the media to ensure that his store and its opening were properly publicized. The opening week ad campaign relied mainly on unpaid promotions in the form of news articles in newspapers, magazines, and journals. As time progressed, Selfridge took the more traditional form of marketing by writing daily columns under the pen name Callisthenes. Overall, however, one of the most effective marketing tools proved to be the opening week cartoons focusing on the grand event. Selfridge enlisted the help of thirty-eight of London’s top illustrators to draw hundreds of full page, half page, and quarter page advertisements for eighteen newspapers. This innovative combination of direct advertisements and newspaper publicities proved to be quite effective at drawing the crowds to the store.

The marketing continued on opening day itself. Touted as “London’s Greatest Store,” Selfridges immediately became a cultural and social phenomenon. From the store's soft lighting to the general absence of price tags to live music from string quartets, every detail of the opening was purposeful to draw people into the entire shopping experience and make each shopper feel unique. At Selfridges, shoppers entered another world in which they became "guests," as the store referred to them, and could purchase unique items that differed from the material goods sold in other stores. The successes of the marketing campaign and the store’s opening day highlight that Selfridges sold an entire lifestyle, not just an impressive array of material products.

Controversies
 After protests by animal welfare advocates, in November 2009 Selfridges agreed to stop selling foie gras (a delicacy made from the livers of forcibly fattened ducks and geese).
 In July 2010, Selfridges apologized publicly after its Manchester store displayed an Alexander McQueen garment hanging from a gallows-like structure, just months after the designer committed suicide by hanging.
 In September 2013, the store suspended a shop assistant who refused to serve a friend of Tommy Robinson.
 In February 2015, one of Selfridges' stores in Manchester installed so-called anti-homeless spikes.

In culture
ITV and Masterpiece produced a series entitled Mr Selfridge, first airing on ITV beginning in January 2013 (in ten parts), and later on PBS starting on 30 March 2013 (in eight parts). ITV began airing ten additional episodes in January 2014. The fourth series began in 2016 with the first episode airing on 8 January 2016.

Selfridges was also featured in the 2017 movie Wonder Woman as the shop where Steve Trevor takes Diana Prince to give her a more contemporary appearance to blend in.

The brand has worked with artists like Jaden Smith and others throughout its history.

References

Further reading
 Honeycombe, Gordon. Selfridges, Seventy-Five Years: The Story of the Store 1909–84. London, 1984. .

External links

 Selfridges website
 Selfridges Group website

 
1908 establishments in England
Department stores of the United Kingdom
Food halls
Oxford Street
Portman estate
Retail companies of the United Kingdom
Retail companies established in 1908
Weston family
2022 mergers and acquisitions